In mathematics, the  transforms and  transforms are complementary pairs of integral transforms involving, respectively, the Neumann function (Bessel function of the second kind)  of order  and the Struve function  of the same order.

For a given function , the -transform of order  is given by

The inverse of above is the -transform of the same order; for a given function , the -transform of order  is given by

These transforms are closely related to the Hankel transform, as both involve Bessel functions.
In problems of mathematical physics and applied mathematics, the Hankel,  transforms all may appear in problems having axial symmetry.
Hankel transforms are however much more commonly seen due to their connection with the 2-dimensional Fourier transform. The ,  transforms appear in situations with singular behaviour on the axis of symmetry (Rooney).

References

 Bateman Manuscript Project: Tables of Integral Transforms Vol. II. Contains extensive tables of transforms: Chapter IX (-transforms) and Chapter XI (-transforms).
  

Integral transforms